Leapmotor is a Chinese automobile manufacturer headquartered in Hangzhou, China, specializing in developing electric vehicles.

History
Leapmotor was founded in December 2015 and is based in Hangzhou, China. 

On June 13, 2018, at CES Asia, Leapmotor announced that the first domestically made artificial intelligence (AI) chip, dubbed “Lingxin 01” has entered the integration verification phase. The AI chip was co-developed by Leapmotor and Zhejiang Dahua Technology Co., Ltd (Dahua Technology), and was expected to be tested on vehicles in the Q2 of 2019. The Lingxin 01 is designed for autonomous vehicles, and features the capability of deep learning and leading computing power. The company vertically integrates high margin components by developing and building its own components such as electric traction motors, vehicle CPU, LED lighting.

In October 2018, Leapmotor announced plans to roll out 3 new models over the span of 2018 to 2021, including the LP-S01, the LP-T03 and the LP-C11, based on the S, T and C vehicle platform respectively.

In June 2019, the first product, the Leapmotor S01 electric 2-door coupe, is launched on the Chinese market. A prototype was shown at the Guangzhou Auto Show 2017. At that time, the company had raised 380 million in capital, and construction of the factory had started. The S01 was initially shown as the LP-S01 coupe earlier in 2018. The first deliveries occurred of the S01 in June 2019.

In May 2020, Leapmotor and State-owned Chinese automaker FAW forged a strategic partnership to jointly develop intelligent electric vehicle models. The agreement also involves the joint cooperation on R&D, manufacture, production and application of intelligent electric vehicle core parts, and the further research on the development of key basic technologies and the innovation of production measures.

On May 11, 2020, Leapmotor officially launched the second mass-production EV, the Leapmotor T03 electric city car. The vehicle was launched with a total of 3 models this time, the price range after subsidy is 65,800-75,800 yuan (~US $9,280 – US $10,691). The Leapmotor T03 equips a battery pack with a capacity of 36.5kWh, and a 403km NEDC cruising range.

In November 2020, Leapmotor officially launched the third mass-production EV, the Leapmotor C11 electric crossover, based on the 2019 C-More concept. The C11 is powered by dual electric motors jointly rated at 544 PS (536 hp / 400 kW) and 720 Nm (531 lb-ft) of torque. The Leapmotor C11 have around 600 km (404 miles) of driving range.

Vehicles

Current models

Leapmotor CO1 is the first electric vehicle with battery cells directly integrated in the underbody.

Concept vehicles
Leapmotor has revealed 1 concept vehicle.

Sales

See also
 Aion
 BYD
 HiPhi
 Nio
 Singulato
 Min'an Electric

References

External links
 

Electric vehicle manufacturers of China
Car brands
Car manufacturers of China
Chinese brands
Manufacturing companies based in Hangzhou
Leapmotor vehicles